Oracle is an upcoming American horror thriller film directed by Daniel Di Grado from a screenplay by Michael Ross and Corey Harrell. The film will star Ryan Destiny and Heather Graham.

Cast
 Ryan Destiny
 Heather Graham
 Ariel Martin

Production
On November 9, 2020 it was announced that Ryan Destiny and Heather Graham would star Oracle, a psychological horror film directed by Daniel di Grado.

Principal photography began on November 12, 2020 and concluded on December 22, 2020 in New Orleans, Louisiana.

References

External links
 

Upcoming films
American horror thriller films
Universal Pictures films
Will Packer Productions films
Films shot in New Orleans